Dryopteris celsa, the log fern, is a perennial fern in the family Dryopteridaceae.  It naturally occurs on rotting logs and the rich soil of swamps and wet woodlands.  Its native range includes the southeastern United States.

References

celsa
Ferns of the United States